Elías Javier Malavé Burgos (born 26 October 1989 in Maturín, Venezuela) is a Venezuelan male archer who competed in the individual event at the 2012 Summer Olympics and 2016 Summer Olympics.  He started archery in 2001 and has represented Venezuelan team since 2006.

International Tournaments and Multi-Sport Events 

Elías Malavé has competed in the Bolivarian Games (2009 - 2013), South American Games (2010 - 2014), Central American and Caribbean Games (2010–2014), Panamerican Games (2011 - 2015), Olympic Games (2012, 2016), World Archery Championships (2006 Youth - 2011 Outdoor - 2012 Indoor - 2015 Outdoor), Archery World Cup (Since 2007 until 2015), the Panamerican Archery Championships and continental events.

National Tournaments 

Elías Malavé has competed in several national tournaments in Venezuela, winning the title of National Champion 12 times.

References

External links
 

1993 births
Archers at the 2012 Summer Olympics
Archers at the 2016 Summer Olympics
Olympic archers of Venezuela
Living people
People from Maturín
Venezuelan male archers
Archers at the 2011 Pan American Games
Archers at the 2015 Pan American Games
Archers at the 2019 Pan American Games
Pan American Games competitors for Venezuela
South American Games gold medalists for Venezuela
South American Games bronze medalists for Venezuela
South American Games medalists in archery
Competitors at the 2010 South American Games
Competitors at the 2014 South American Games
21st-century Venezuelan people